The Potemkin Stairs, Potemkin Steps, or Primorsky Stairs are a giant stairway in Odesa, Ukraine. They are considered a formal entrance into the city from the direction of the sea and are the best known symbol of Odesa.

The stairs were originally known as the Boulevard steps, the Giant Staircase, or the Richelieu steps. The top step is 12.5 meters (41 feet) wide, and the lowest step is 21.7 meters (70.8 feet) wide. The staircase extends for 142 meters, but it gives the illusion of greater length.

History 

Odesa, perched on a high steppe plateau, needed direct access to the harbor below it. Before the stairs were constructed, winding paths and crude wooden stairs were the only access to the harbor.

The original 200 stairs were commissioned by Prince Mikhail Semyonovich Vorontsov, the regional governor-general, as both a gift to his wife Elisabeth and to gain support from the local elites, many of whom lived at the top of the future staircase along Primorsky Boulevard. Accordingly, they were originally referred to variously as the Primorsky Stairs, or alternatively as the Boulevard Stairs or Giant Stairs. They were designed in 1837 by Italian architect Francesco Boffo and St. Petersburg architects Avraam Melnikov and Pot'e. The staircase cost 800,000 rubles to build.

In 1837, the decision was made to build a "monstrous staircase", which was constructed between 1837 and 1841. English engineer John Upton supervised construction. Upton had fled Britain while on bail for forgery.
Upton went on to oversee the construction of the huge dry-docks constructed in Sevastopol and completed in 1853.

Greenish-grey sandstone from the Austrian port of Trieste (now in Italy) was shipped in.

As erosion destroyed the stairs, in 1933 the sandstone was replaced by rose-grey granite from the Boh area, and the landings were covered with asphalt. Eight steps were lost under the sand when the port was being extended, reducing the number of stairs to 192, with ten landings.

The steps were made famous in Sergei Eisenstein's 1925 silent film Battleship Potemkin. On 11 July 2015, during the 6th International Film Festival, the European Film Academy put a commemorative plate on the stairs. The plate indicates that the Potemkin staircase is a memorable place for European cinema.

On the left side of the stairs, a funicular railway was built in 1906 to transport people up and down instead of walking.  After 73 years of operation (with breaks caused by revolution and war), the funicular was replaced by an escalator in 1970. The escalator was in turn closed in 1997 but a new funicular was opened on 2 September 2005.

In 1955, during the Soviet era, the Primorsky Stairs were renamed as Potemkin Stairs to honor the 50th anniversary of the mutiny on the battleship Potemkin. After the restoration of Ukrainian independence in 1991, like many streets in Odesa, the historic name, "Primorsky Stairs," was reinstated.

Duke de Richelieu Monument 

At the top of the stairs is the Duke de Richelieu Monument, depicting Odesa's town governor.  The Roman-toga figure was designed by the Russian sculptor, Ivan Petrovich Martos (1754–1835). The statue was cast in bronze by Yefimov and unveiled in 1826. It is the first monument erected in the city, and memorializes him for the period of growth and prosperity he led during the 11 years of his administration.

Observations and descriptions of the stairs

Gallery

See also 
 Odesa Funicular
 Depaldo stone stairs
 Yerevan Cascade
 FC Chornomorets Odesa
 The Filatov Institute of Eye Diseases & Tissue Therapy
 Odesa Opera and Ballet Theatre
 Seventh-Kilometer Market
 Rocky Steps
 Joker Stairs
 Exorcist steps

References

External links 

 

Buildings and structures in Odesa
Tourist attractions in Odesa
Stairways
Transport infrastructure completed in 1841